Pajwar is a village in Roshan, Shughnan district, Badakhshan Province, north-eastern Afghanistan.

The people of this village speak the Roshani language (sometimes considered a dialect of Shighnan) and also Persian.

See also

Badakhshan Province

References

External links
Satellite map at Maplandia.com

Populated places in Shighnan District